Diogo Augusto Tavares Fonseca da Costa (born 11 December 1984 in Ponta Delgada, Azores) is a Portuguese former professional footballer who played as a centre forward.

References

External links

1984 births
Living people
People from Ponta Delgada
Portuguese footballers
Association football forwards
Primeira Liga players
Liga Portugal 2 players
Segunda Divisão players
CU Micaelense players
C.D. Santa Clara players
Vitória F.C. players
Boavista F.C. players
C.D. Feirense players
C.D. Aves players
C.D. Tondela players
Académico de Viseu F.C. players
U.D. Oliveirense players
S.C. Praiense players
Segunda División B players
Tercera División players
RCD Mallorca B players
Granada CF footballers
Liga I players
FC Brașov (1936) players
Portugal youth international footballers
Portugal under-21 international footballers
Portuguese expatriate footballers
Expatriate footballers in Spain
Expatriate footballers in Romania
Portuguese expatriate sportspeople in Spain
Portuguese expatriate sportspeople in Romania